Below is a list of sheriffs of the County of London, from the creation of the county in 1889 to its abolition in 1965:

1889–1890: Alfred de Rothschild, of Senmore Place
1890–1891: Sir James Whitehead, Bart, of Highlield House, Catford Bridge
1891–1892: Martin Ridley Smith, of 13 Upper Belgrave Street
1892–1893: Bertram Wodehouse Currie, of 1 Richmond Terrace, Whitehall
1893–1894: Samuel Hope Morley, of 43 Upper Grosvenor Street
1894–1895: Ferdinand Huth, of 44 Upper Grosvenor Street
1895–1896: George Faudel-Phillips, of 36 Newgate Street
1896–1897: Henry Parkman Sturgis, of 4 Great Cumberland Place
1897–1898: Henry James Lubbock, of 15 Lombard Street
1898–1899: Samuel Henry Faudel-Phillips, of 17 Grosvenor Street
1899–1900: Sir Robert George Wyndham Herbert, GCB, of 3 Whitehall Court, SW
1900–1901: John Verity, of 18 Cadogan Place
1901–1902: Arthur Hill, of 22 Upper Grosvenor Street
1902–1903: George William Howard Bowen, of 67 Whitehall Court
1903–1904: Riversdale Grenfell, of the Guards' Club, Pall Mall
1904–1905: Benjamin Samuel Faudel-Phillips, of 52 Grosvenor Gardens
1905–1906: Allan Campbell, of 21 Upper Brook Street
1906–1907: St John Hornby, of Shelley House, Chelsea Embankment, SW
1907–1908: Robert Lydston Newman, of 11 Cadogan Square, SW
1908–1909: John Murray, JP, DL, of 50 Albemarle Street, W
1909–1910: George Herbert Verity, of 7 Basil Street
1910–1911: Herbert Brooks, of 17 Princes Gardens, SW
1911–1912: Charles Guy Pym, of 35 Cranley Gardens, SW
1912–1913: Geoffrey Lubbock, of 65 Lowndes Square, SW
1913–1914: Walter Cunliffe, of 86 Brook Street, W
1914–1915: John Murray, Jr., of 50 Albemarle Street, W
1915–1916: Ernest Tatham Richmond, of 12 Cheyne Gardens
1916–1917: Henry Alexander Trotter, of 19 Queen Street, W
1917–1918: The Hon. Geoffrey Hope Morley, of 7 Connaught Place, W
1918–1919: The Rt. Hon. Frederick Huth Jackson, of 64 Rutland Gate, SW
1919–1920: Henry John Gardiner, of 25 Tavistock Square, WC1
1920–1921: Col. Lionel Henry Hanbury, CMG, VD, of Hitcham House, Burnham, Buckinghamshire
1921–1922: Algernon Osmond Miles, of 15 Thorney Court, Palace Gate
1922–1923: Sir Alan Garrett Anderson, KBE, of 19 Craven Hill, W2
1923–1924: Walter Kennedy Whigham, of 2 Chesham Street, SW1,
1924–1925: Sir Samuel Ernest Palmer, Bt, of 10 Grosvenor Crescent, SW1
1925–1926: Arthur Whitworth, of 16 Norfolk Crescent, Hyde Park, W2
1926–1927: Michael Seymour Spencer-Smith, DSO MC, of 34, Dover Street, W1
1927–1928: Sir William Plender, Bt, GBE, of 51 Kensington Court, W8
1928–1929: Capt. The Hon. Roland Dudley Kitson, DSO, MC, of 3 Victoria Street, SW1
1929–1930: Albert Charles Gladstone, MBE, of 23 Hyde Park Place, W1
1930–1931: The Hon. George Charles Colville, MBE, 66 Eccleston Square, SW1,
1931–1932: The Hon. Alexander Shaw, of 24 Princes Gate, SW7
1932–1933: Sir Ernest John Pickstone Benn, Bt, CBE, of 2 Whitehall Court, SW1
1933–1934: Charles Jocelyn Hambro, of 18 New Cavendish Street, W1
1934–1935: Victor Blagden, of 46 Park Street, W1
1935–1936: Charles Morley, of 83 Harley House, Regents Park, NW1
1936–1937: George Macaulay Booth, of 28 Chester Street, SW1
1937–1938: Herbert Arthur Baker, of 1 Clarendon Place, W2
1938–1939: The Hon. Claude Hope Hope-Morley, of 42 Grosvenor Square, W1
1939–1940: Sir Andrew Rae Duncan, GBE, of Dunure, Foxgrove Road, Beckenham, Kent
1940–1941: Basil Gage Catterns, of 9 Dorchester Court, Sloane Street, SW1
1941–1942: Edward Holland-Martin, of 24a Bryanston Square, W1
1942–1943: Dallas Gerald Mercer Bernard, of Howard Hotel, Norfolk Street, Strand, WC2
1943–1944: John Coldbrook Hanbury-Williams, of 16 St Martin's-le-Grand, EC1
1944–1945: Sir Patrick Ashley Cooper, of Claridge's Hotel, Brook Street, W1
1945–1946: Sir Otto Ernst Niemeyer, GBE, KCB, of Claridge's Hotel, Brook Street, W.1.
1946–1947: Cameron Fromanteel Cobbold, of Flat 856, The White House, Albany Street, N.W.1.
1947–1948: Laurence John Cadbury, of Flat 68, 56 Curzon Street, Mayfair, W.1.
1948–1949: Basil Sanderson, MC, of Ayot Bury, Welwyn, Hertfordshire.
1949–1950: Harry Arthur Siepmann, of 107, Pall Mall, S.W.1.
1950–1951: Ralph Ellis Brook, OBE, of Chestnut Lodge, Squire's Mount, N.W.3.
1951–1952: The Hon. Hugh Kenyon Molesworth Kindersley, CBE, MC, of 9, North Audley Street, W.1.
1952–1953: Sir George Lewis French Bolton, KCMG, of 39a, Bryanston Court, George Street, W.1.
1953–1954: Michael James Babington Smith, CBE, of 10, Chester Row, S.W.1.
1954–1955: Geoffrey Cecil Ryves Eley, CBE, of 1, Pembroke Villas, W.8.
1955–1956: William Antony Acton, of 115, Eaton Square, S.W.1.
1956–1957: Sir Charles Jocelyn Hambro, KBE, MC, of 72, North Gate, Regent's Park, N.W.8.
1957–1958: Sir Patrick Ashley Cooper, of 178, St. James's Court, Buckingham Gate, S.W.1.
1958–1959: Sir John Coldbrook Hanbury-Williams, Kt, CVO, of 7 Princes Gate, S.W.7.
1959–1960: Laurence John Cadbury, OBE, of Carrington House, Hertford Street, London W.1.
1960–1961: John Nicholson Hogg, TD, of 22 Pelham Crescent, London S.W.7.
1961–1962: Sir George Lewis French Bolton, KCMG, of 809 Beatty House, Dolphin Square, London S.W.1.
1962–1963: Michael James Babington Smith, CBE, TD, of 10 Chester Row, S.W.1.
1963–1964: Sir (Frank) Cyril Hawker, Kt, of 3 Wildcroft Manor, Putney Heath, S.W.15.
1964–1965: John Melior Stevens, DSO, OBE, TD, of 62 Bedford Gardens, W.8.

See also
 High Sheriff of Greater London
 Sheriffs of the City of London

References

 
 
London
High Sheriffs
History of London
1889 establishments in England
1965 establishments in England